Mamsapuram is a town located in Srivilliputhur Taluk and comes under Srivilliputtur Assembly constituency, Virudhunagar District in the Indian State of Tamil Nadu.

Demographics
 India census, Mamsapuram had a population of 17,931. Males constitute 49% of the population and females 51%. Mamsapuram has an average literacy rate of 65%, higher than the national average of 59.5%: male literacy is 74%, and female literacy is 56%. In Mamsapuram, 11% of the population is under 6 years of age.

Reference 

Cities and towns in Virudhunagar district